Victoria Dock may refer to:

Australia
 Victoria Dock (Hobart)
 Victoria Dock (Melbourne) - previously part of the Port of Melbourne, now part of the Melbourne Docklands redevelopment and called Victoria Harbour

India
 Victoria Dock, Mumbai

South Africa
 Victoria & Alfred Waterfront, Cape Town

United Kingdom
 Royal Victoria Dock, London
 Victoria Dock, Liverpool, Liverpool
 Victoria Dock, Hull, Kingston upon Hull